The Genève-Servette HC (also called Servette or GSHC) is a professional ice hockey club based in Geneva, Switzerland and competing in the National League (NL), the top tier of the Swiss hockey league system. The team plays their home games at the Patinoire des Vernets, which has a seating capacity of 7,135.

The team is currently the oldest team in the NL, being founded in 1905.

Team history
 1905 : Foundation of Servette FC's ice hockey section.
 1954 : The club plays on artificial ice for the first time, in the "Pavillon des Sports". Until then, Servette had to host its opponents in Lausanne or au Pont. The first match on the new artificial ice sees Servette play Urania Genève Sport (UGS).
 1956 : First promotion in Swiss National League B.
 1958 : Inauguration of the new ice rink called "Les Vernets".
 1959 : Servette wins the "Swiss Cup" after beating Neuchâtel-Sports Young Sprinters HC 7–3 in the final, in front of  fans, it is a crowd record for a hockey game in Les Vernets.
 1963 : Creation of Genève-Servette HC after the fusion of the ice hockey sections of Servette & UGS.
 1964 : Genève-Servette is champion of the Swiss National League B (second division), after beating the EHC Biel in the final, and is promoted to the top league in Switzerland, the National League A.
 1975 : Relegated to the Swiss National League B.
 1980 : Relegated to 1. Liga (3rd division).
 1995 : Promoted to National League B again, after a victory over Luzern.
 2001 : Promoted to National League A, after a successful series (4–0) over Chur in the final.
 2008 : On March 24, the GSHC reaches the Swiss National League A final for the first time in its history, after a clear win over HC Fribourg-Gottéron in the semi-finals (4–1 in the series).
 2010 : After a good season (2nd place), the GSHC defeated HC Fribourg-Gottéron in quarter-finals after being led 3–1 and EV Zug in semi-finals. Against SC Bern in Finals, the GSHC came back from 3–1 to 3–3 before losing the seventh game in Bern.
 2011 : Were third-most attended team in Switzerland for the 2010–11 season with 6,971 spectators per game.
 2013 : Winner of the Spengler Cup.
 2014 : Second consecutive Spengler Cup win.
 2017 : Fell to EHC Kloten in the Swiss Cup final.

Team information

Les Vernets

The Patinoire des Vernets was built in 1959 and is located in the Geneva neighborhood of the same name. It serves as the main arena for the GSHC. It was renovated in 2009 in order to increase the spectator capacity from 6400 to 7140.

On January 24, 2012, local authorities and the club reached an agreement to build a new arena, in another part of town, with a seating capacity of 10,000. In 2012, it was scheduled to open by 2015, or possibly 2016. As of 2019, construction has yet to start.

Mascots

The official mascots of Genève-Servette are Calvin and Calvina, two anthropomorphic eagles that first appeared at the beginning of the 2006-2007 season. They are Switzerland's first and only mascot duet. Their names are derived from John Calvin, famous theologian of the Protestant reformation in Geneva.

In addition, Sherkan, a bald eagle, opens every home game by flying throughout the arena, reaching for his master standing in the center of ice. Sherkan is very popular amongst fans and players alike. Sherkan is Europe's first living animal to partake in an ice-hockey game opening ceremony.

Sherkan first appeared during the NLB playoffs of 2001 and has been present to every home game ever since, only missing two.

Head coaches

Chris McSorley served as head coach and general manager between 2001 and 2017 and was also co-owner until 2014, alongside Hugh Quennec. Chris McSorley is the brother of Marty McSorley, two times winner of the Stanley Cup with the Edmonton Oilers. On March 22, 2017, Chris McSorley stepped down as head coach to focus on his job as general manager. A position he assumed for the entire 2017–18 season. At the end of this season, it was announced that McSorley would return as head coach of Geneva for the 2018/19 season, while keeping his position as general manager. McSorley had signed a 15-year contract with the team in September 2016 worth CHF 10 million, while the club was still under Quennec ownership. The contract runs through the 2030/31 season.

On June 26, 2017, it was announced that Craig Woodcroft would replace McSorley at the helm of the team for the next three seasons. At the end of the 2017/18 season, Woodcroft was relieved of his duties as head coach after only one season. Geneva will still pay him the remaining CHF 2 million on his contract.

On April 17, 2019, Patrick Emond, the Junior Elite team's coach was promoted head coach. He worked with the Junior team for 9 years, winning recently 2 national titles with them. It will be his first experience with an adult team.
 On November 10, 2021, Emond was fired by Servette as the team was sitting 11th in the standings after 23 regular season games at the time. Jan Cadieux, who was an assistant coach at the time, took over as head coach. Louis Matte, Sébastien Beaulieu, Mathieu Fernandes and Kevin Oulevey remained in the coaching staff.

Honors

Champions

SL Championship (1): 2001
Swiss Cup (2): 1959, 1972
Spengler Cup (2): 2013, 2014
Basler Cup (1): 1962

Runners-up

NL Championship (3): 2008, 2010, 2021
NDA Championship (7): 1917, 1920, 1966, 1967, 1968, 1969, 1971
Swiss Cup (1): 2017

Players

Current roster

Notable alumni

 Logan Couture
 Yannick Weber
 Tom Pyatt
 Reto Pavoni
 Philippe Bozon
 Oleg Petrov
 Kevin Romy
 Goran Bezina
 Juraj Kolník
 Daniel Vukovic
 Igor Fedulov

References

External links
 Official site of Genève-Servette Hockey Club
  Site officiel du Genève-Servette Hockey Club
  Official Fan-club webpage
  Fan-page

Ice hockey clubs established in 1905
Ice hockey teams in Switzerland
Sport in Geneva
1905 establishments in Switzerland